"Another Day" is a song by Italian Eurodance project Whigfield, which was performed by Danish-born Sannie Charlotte Carlson. It was released in August 1994 as the second single from her debut album, Whigfield (1995). The song was the follow-up single to her 1994 hit single, "Saturday Night" and peaked at number seven in the UK. "Another Day" also became a top 10 hit in Canada, Denmark, Finland, Ireland, Italy, Norway, Spain, Switzerland and Zimbabwe. On the Eurochart Hot 100, it reached number nine.

Critical reception
Swedish Aftonbladet complimented "Another Day" as "a very good song" and very similar to "Saturday Night". AllMusic editor William Cooper described it as "irresistibly catchy". Larry Flick from Billboard found that it's "flying over the top with giddy kiddie flavors", noting that "the beats have breakneck energy, and the synths have a shiny, candy-coated flavor." Chris Heath from The Daily Telegraph felt it was "much-underestimated". Ross Jones from The Guardian declared the song as "fabulous". Giles Smith from The Independent wrote, "It has a stock night-club drum beat, a few synthesisers plunking and juddering. This time, she informs us that she's running around and that she can't live another day without us." In his weekly UK chart commentary, James Masterton commented, that "there is no denying that the two tracks use exactly the same baseline and have an almost identical annoying piano figure running throughout. Having said that, "Another Day" is in some ways the better record of the two, being more of a proper song rather than "Saturday Night"'s sequence of lyrical set-pieces." 

A reviewer from Music Week wrote, "Take the bass and keyboards from "Saturday Night" and add a touch of Mungo Jerry's "In the Summertime", and there you have it, the follow-up to a million seller. For those who liked "Saturday Night", it is inevitably a disappointment; for those who didn't, it's better than you'd expect." John Kilgo from The Network Forty stated that here's "a very poppy uptempo dance number that will explode—especially at night." He added that Whigfield's "unique vocals and high-energy groove are the perfect combination for a great follow-up". Colin Paterson from The Observer felt the follow up "was the identical "Another Day". A case of Saturday Night, Sunday Mourning."

Chart performance
"Another Day" was quite successful on the charts in Europe. It peaked at number three in both Denmark and Italy, and was a top 10 hit also in Finland (8), Ireland (5), Norway (9), Scotland (7), Spain (6), Switzerland (9) and the UK. In the latter, it peaked at number seven after five weeks at the UK Singles Chart, where the song debuted at number 13 on 4 December 1994. On the Eurochart Hot 100, "Another Day" reached number nine. Additionally, it was a top 20 hit in Germany (12) and a top 30 hit in France (24) and Iceland (22). Outside Europe, it also entered the top 10 in Canada, where the single reached number two on both The Record singles chart and the RPM Dance/Urban chart. In the US, "Another Day" charted on the Billboard Hot Dance Club Play chart, peaking at number 21. In Zimbabwe, it was far more successful, reaching number five. 

The single was awarded with a silver record in the United Kingdom, with 200,000 singles sold.

Music video
The accompanying music video for "Another Day" can be seen as a continuation of the video for "Saturday Night". In the beginning, Whigfield arrives at a restaurant where she is supposed to meet someone. The person never shows up and Whigfield are sitting all by herself, singing. A couple sitting next to her have an argument and the woman throws the contents of the glass in the man's face. Next, some scenes show Whigfield waiting for someone in a theater, while other scenes show her sitting in the stairs while people come and go. In the end, she drives by taxi to the hotel where she lives and packs her things. The picture of the man she kissed in the front of the mirror in the video of "Saturday Night" is placed on the bedside table in her room. Whigfield lets the picture fall to the floor and leaves the hotel room. The video was later published on YouTube in March 2013, and had generated more than 3.6 million views as of November 2022.

Releases

 UK: CD-maxi: Systematic
"Another Day" (Radio Nite Mix)
"Another Day" (Club Remix)
"Another Day" (Nite Mix)
"Another Day" (Another Mix)
"Another Day" (Two Man Remix)

 Germany: CD-maxi: ZYX Music
"Another Day" (Radio Nite Mix) 
"Another Day" (Bubble Gum Radio) 
"Another Day" (Bubble Gum Mix) 
"Another Day" (Nite Mix)

 Netherlands: CD-maxi: Dino Music
"Another Day" (Radio Nite Mix) 4:04
"Another Day" (Bubble Gum Radio) 4:01
"Another Day" (Nite Mix) 5:00
"Another Day" (Radio Nite Mix) 4:02

 Denmark: CD-maxi
"Another Day" (Radio Nite Mix) 
"Another Day" (Bubble Gum Radio) 
"Another Day" (Nite Mix) 
"Another Day" (Bubble Gum Mix)

 Australia: CD single
"Another Day" (Radio Nite Mix)
"Another Day" (Club Remix)
"Another Day" (BubbleGum Radio Mix)
"Another Day" (Two Men Remix)
"Another Day" (Another Day Mix)
"Another Day" (Nite Mix)
"Another Day" (Out of Time Remix)
"Another Day" (French Remix)

Charts and certifications

Weekly charts

Year-end charts

Certifications

References

1994 singles
1994 songs
English-language Italian songs
Songs written by Larry Pignagnoli
Songs written by Ann Lee (singer)
Songs written by Ray Dorset
Whigfield songs